The Archer is the second studio album by American musician Alexandra Savior. It was released on January 10, 2020 through 30th Century Records.

Background and recording 
After releasing her debut studio album, Belladonna of Sadness, she submitted a couple demos but Columbia records rejected them. The album was, in fact, finished in December 2018 but the label lost interest and dropped her and her manager quit. She thought that she'd never record ever again. She moved back to her hometown of Portland and started going to school, but her friend Danger Mouse offered her a deal and signed her to 30th Century Records.

The album was produced by Sam Cohen, a Texas-based producer, and recorded at Dumbo, Brooklyn. Unlike her debut album, she wrote all the lyrics and guitar parts for the album. Her collaboration with Alex Turner caused many misconceptions about her musical direction on the public eye, but with her second album, she took full control. 

The track that gave its name to the album, The Archer, was written as a gift for her then-boyfriend, and the music video was directed by herself and artist Alexandria Saleem in 2017.

Promotion 
Her lead single, "Crying All The Time" was released on June 13, 2019.  The music video was directed by Joseph Bird.

Three more singles, "Saving Grace", "The Archer" and "Howl", were released before the album.

Critical reception 

The Archer was met with universal acclaim reviews from critics. At Metacritic, which assigns a weighted average rating out of 100 to reviews from mainstream publications, this release received an average score of 84, based on 4 reviews.

Track listing
All tracks written by Alexandra Savior.

References

2020 albums
Alexandra Savior albums